Dr. Sigmar Wittig (born 25 February 1940 in Nimptsch, former Silesia region of Germany) has been the Chairman of the Executive Board of the German Aerospace Center (Deutsches Zentrum für Luft- und Raumfahrt) since March 2002. He was the chair of the European Space Agency Council for a two-year term between 1 July 2005 and 30 June 2007.

Professor Wittig was instrumental in starting an exchange program between Purdue University and the University of Karlsruhe called the Global Engineering Alliance for Research and Education (GEARE).

Curriculum vitae
He studied mechanical engineering at the RWTH Aachen, finishing with a doctorate in 1967. This was followed by a 9-year spell in the U.S., as an associate professor at Purdue University.

In 1976, he went back to Germany to the University of Karlsruhe, to lead the Institute of Thermal Turbomachinery. From 1994 to 2002, he was president of the university.

References

External links
 ESA press release on Dr Wittig's appointment
 Biography of Sigmar Wittig at the German Aerospace Center

1940 births
Living people
People from Niemcza
European Space Agency personnel
People from the Province of Silesia
Officers Crosses of the Order of Merit of the Federal Republic of Germany
German expatriates in the United States
RWTH Aachen University alumni